David Allen Johnson (born January 30, 1943) is an American former professional baseball player and manager. He played as a second baseman from  through , most notably as a member of the Baltimore Orioles dynasty that won four American League pennants and two World Series championships between 1966 and 1971. Johnson played in Major League Baseball from 1965 to 1975, then played for two seasons in the Nippon Professional Baseball league before returning to play in Major League Baseball with the Philadelphia Phillies and Chicago Cubs from 1977 to 1978. A three-time Rawlings Gold Glove Award winner, he was selected to four All-Star Game teams during his playing career.

After retiring as a player, Johnson became a successful manager. He led the New York Mets to the 1986 World Series title, and to an additional National League East title in 1988. He won the American League's Manager of the Year Award in 1997 when he led the Baltimore Orioles wire-to-wire to the American League East division championship. He won the same award in the National League in 2012 when he led the Washington Nationals to the franchise's first division title since moving to Washington, D.C., and their first overall since 1981. Johnson managed teams to their respective League Championship Series in three consecutive years  – the Cincinnati Reds in 1995 and the Orioles in both 1996 and 1997. He also managed the Los Angeles Dodgers.

Playing career
After one season playing baseball at Texas A&M University, Johnson signed with the Baltimore Orioles as an amateur free agent in 1962. Johnson was then assigned to the Stockton Ports in the Class C California League where he hit .309 with 10 home runs and 63 runs batted in in 97 games.  Promoted to the AA Elmira Pioneers in 1963, Johnson hit .326 in 63 games before advancing to the AAA Rochester Red Wings for the final 63 games of the season. Returning to the Red Wings for the entire 1964 season, Johnson had 19 HRs, 73 RBI, and 87 runs.

In 1965, Johnson made the Orioles out of spring training, but after hitting only .170 in 20 games he spent the latter part of the season with the Red Wings, batting .301 in 52 games. Back with the Orioles in 1966, Johnson saw limited playing time until the Orioles created space in the lineup for him by trading second baseman Jerry Adair to the Chicago White Sox on June 13. Johnson then hit for a .257 batting average, seven home runs and 56 RBI to finish third in American League Rookie of the Year balloting for 1966. Johnson was a full-time starter in the major leagues for the next eight seasons, averaging over 142 games played in a season.

He also won the AL Gold Glove Award the final three seasons. Orioles shortstop Mark Belanger won the award as well in 1969 and 1971, joining a select list of shortstop-second baseman combinations to have won the honor in the same season. Third baseman Brooks Robinson also was in the middle of his record 16 straight Gold Glove streak when Johnson and Belanger won their awards.

Upset after being replaced as the starting second baseman by Bobby Grich, and with the Orioles in need of a power-hitting catcher, Johnson was traded along with Pat Dobson, Johnny Oates and Roric Harrison to the Atlanta Braves for Earl Williams and Taylor Duncan on the last day of the Winter Meetings on December 1, 1972. The following season with the Braves, Johnson hit 40 home runs for the first and only time in his career, tying Rogers Hornsby's record for most single-season home runs by a second baseman with 42, and hitting a 43rd as a pinch-hitter. His record stood for 48 years until Marcus Semien hit 45 home runs in 2021. Johnson's second-highest home run total was 18, in the 1971 season. That same season Atlanta's Darrell Evans hit 41 home runs, and Hank Aaron hit 40 home, making the 1973 Braves the first team to feature three teammates that each hit 40 home runs in the same season.

Four games into the 1975 season and after getting a hit in his only at bat, Johnson was released by the Braves.

He then signed with the Yomiuri Giants of Japan's Central League, with whom he played in both the 1975 and 1976 seasons. Johnson was the Giants' first foreign player of note in more than 15 years, and faced a lot of pressure to perform in Japan. He struggled in his first season, battling injuries, and incurred the wrath of the Giants' manager (and former Hall of Fame player) Shigeo Nagashima. Despite playing much better in 1976, Johnson was not invited back by the Giants, who also reportedly prevented him from signing with any other NPB teams.

In 1977, Johnson returned to the United States, signing as a free agent with the Philadelphia Phillies. As a utility infielder Johnson still hit .321 with 8 home runs in 78 games and played in one game in the Phillies' National League Championship Series loss to the Dodgers.

During the 1978 season, Johnson hit two grand slams as a pinch-hitter, becoming the first major leaguer to accomplish this in a season. (Four other players, Mike Ivie (1978), Darryl Strawberry (1998), Ben Broussard (2004), and Brooks Conrad (2010), subsequently equaled Johnson's feat.) Shortly afterwards, Philadelphia dealt him to the Chicago Cubs, with whom he played the final 24 games of his career before retiring at the end of the season.

Managing career

Minor leagues
In 1979, Johnson was hired to be the manager of the Miami Amigos of the AAA Inter-American League. Although Johnson guided the team of released and undrafted players to a .708 winning percentage, the league folded 72 games into its only season, having planned to play a 130-game season. In 1981, Johnson was hired to manage the New York Mets AA team, the Jackson Mets, leading the team to a 68–66 record in his only season with the team. In 1983, Johnson was named as the manager of the Mets AAA Tidewater Tides, which finished with a 71–68 record.

New York Mets

Johnson took over the Mets in 1984, a team that had not won a pennant since 1973. He became the first National League manager to win at least 90 games in each of his first five seasons. The highlight of his time with the Mets was winning the 1986 World Series against the Boston Red Sox. While with the Orioles in 1969, Johnson was the final out in the Miracle Mets World Series win.

Years later, he summed up his approach to managing by saying, "I treated my players like men.  As long as they won for me on the field, I didn't give a flying fuck what they did otherwise." The 1983 team had won 68 games, but talent was showing for a potential winner with rookie Darryl Strawberry. A trade to acquire Keith Hernandez and Johnson's decision to suggest bringing up Dwight Gooden helped turn them into a winner of 90 games for the 1984 season. Gary Carter was acquired before that year, and the Mets won 98 games the next year, but it was only good enough for another second-place finish (three games behind St. Louis). The 1986 team won 108 games, which was the best in the majors. It was only the second time the Mets won 100 games in a season, with the other time being 1969.

The Mets won 92 games the following season, but they fell three games short of matching St. Louis. The next year, they won 100 games to win the division. The NLCS ended with a seven-game loss to the Los Angeles Dodgers, which turned on a loss in Game 4 after winning the first two of three games.

He had a bitter feud with general manager Frank Cashen. When the Mets struggled early in the 1990 season, starting the season 20–22, he was fired.  He finished with a record of 595 wins and 417 losses in the regular season and 11 wins and nine losses in the post-season. He remains the winningest manager in Mets history and was inducted into the Mets Hall of Fame with Frank Cashen, Darryl Strawberry, and Dwight Gooden on August 1, 2010.

Cincinnati Reds
After more than two seasons out of baseball, the Cincinnati Reds hired Johnson 44 games into the 1993 season. As was the case with the Mets, Johnson revived the Reds almost immediately. He led the team to the National League Central lead at the time of the 1994 players' strike and won the first official NL Central title in 1995. However, early in the 1995 season, Reds owner Marge Schott announced Johnson would not return in 1996, regardless of how the Reds did. Schott named former Reds third baseman Ray Knight (who had played for Johnson on the Mets championship team) as bench coach, with the understanding that he would take over as manager in 1996.

Johnson and Schott had never gotten along, and relations had deteriorated to the point that he had nearly been fired after the 1994 season. According to Johnson, Schott would even send notes to him that were addressed to him by her St. Bernard. By most accounts, the final straw came because Schott did not approve of Johnson living with his fiancée Susan before they were married (the two met in 1993 and married a year later). According to The Washington Post, Schott had decided before the 1995 season even started that it would be Johnson's last one in Cincinnati. The Reds defeated the Dodgers in the NLDS and reached the NLCS in Johnson's last season as the Reds' manager, being swept by the eventual World Series champion Atlanta Braves. Johnson finished with a record of 204 wins and 172 losses in the regular season and three wins and four losses in the post-season.

Baltimore Orioles
In 1996, Johnson returned to Baltimore as the Orioles' manager on a three-year, $2.25 million contract. The Orioles had gone 71-73 the previous year, but the team had promising talent to go with future Hall of Famers Cal Ripken Jr., Mike Mussina, Eddie Murray, and Roberto Alomar. The team went 88–74, finishing four games behind the New York Yankees in the AL East but it was good enough for the Wild Card by three games. It was the Orioles' first trip to the postseason since winning the 1983 World Series. The Orioles met the Cleveland Indians in the Division Series, the defending champion of the American League who had won 99 games, the best in the majors that season. The Orioles won the first two games before Cleveland forced a Game 4 with a win, and they were one inning away from forcing another one before the Orioles rallied with an Alomar two-out RBI single, and he gave them the lead in the 12th on a home run that delivered Baltimore to the Championship Series against the New York Yankees. The Orioles were leading Game 1 4–3 in the eighth inning before a fly ball hit by Derek Jeter was illegally caught over the fence by fan Jeffrey Maier over the hands of Tony Tarasco that tied the game. The Yankees won the game in the eleventh inning, and while the Orioles rebounded to win Game 2, the Yankees then won the next three; Game 3 saw a blown lead by the Orioles in the eighth inning that turned a 2–1 lead into a 5–2 loss, while the Yankees scored three runs in the eighth in Game 4 to blow open an 8-4 decision, while Game 5 saw the Yankees score all the runs they needed in the third inning for a 6-4 clincher.

The Orioles did even better in the following season, as they went 98–64 to finish with the best record in the American League while retaining the key core from before (albeit with the loss of Murray while acquiring future Hall of Famer Harold Baines mid-season). In the Division Series, they faced the Seattle Mariners. The Orioles won the series in four games, as they routed the Mariners with 23 runs while allowing just 11. They met the Cleveland Indians in the Championship Series, who had upset the Yankees. The Orioles lost in a heartbreaker of a playoff series, however. All four losses in the series to the Indians were by one run, with two of them happening in extra innings (Game 3, for example, was lost on an alleged missed call of a foul tipped bunt). The Orioles outscored Cleveland 19–18 and out-hit them 54–40, but the Indians prevailed in Game 6 to advance to the World Series.

However, Johnson and Orioles owner Peter Angelos never got along. In fact, the two men almost never spoke to each other. The end reportedly came when Johnson fined Roberto Alomar for skipping a team banquet in April 1997 and an exhibition game against the AAA Rochester Red Wings during the 1997 All-Star Break. Johnson ordered Alomar to pay the fine by making out a check to a charity for which his wife served as a fundraiser. However, Alomar donated the money to another charity after players' union lawyers advised him of the possible conflict of interest. In negotiations after the season, Angelos let it be known that he was considering firing Johnson for the Alomar fine, believing his conduct to not be appropriate. Johnson was prepared to admit he had made an error in judgment regarding the fine, but Angelos demanded Johnson admit he had acted recklessly in not leaving the decision to him, which presumably would have given Angelos grounds to fire Johnson for cause. Johnson refused to do so. Johnson had doubts over whether he would return for the final year of his contract (saying as much eight days after the Orioles had lost on October 15), and a spirited 90-minute phone call between Johnson and Angelos a week later was the last time they spoke to each other. He offered his resignation by fax (after failing to reach Angelos by phone), which Angelos accepted on the same day that Johnson was named American League Manager of the Year on November 5. Johnson did not express bitterness with his time in Baltimore, although Angelos released the text of his response letter to the resignation, stating that Johnson's letter "fails to recognize the real issue posed by your imposition and handling of the Alomar fine and your divisive statement to the press in July that unless the Orioles got to the World Series, you would not be permitted to return ... Your own actions and conduct, not mine, have produced the fulfillment of your prophecy."

The Orioles hired his pitching coach in Ray Miller (who Angelos had hired after ordering Pat Dobson to be removed after the 1996 season), but the team would not have another winning season, let alone garner a postseason berth, until 2012. As Orioles manager, Johnson logged a winning percentage of .574.

Los Angeles Dodgers
Johnson had interviewed with the Toronto Blue Jays after the 1997 season but wasn't hired. Two years later, he returned to the majors as manager of the Los Angeles Dodgers, who had won 88 games the previous year. On May 3, he won his 1,000th game as manager, doing so with a 7–0 victory over the Montreal Expos. Johnson did so in his 1,740th game as manager. No manager reached the 1,000 wins plateau nearly as fast as Johnson until Joe Girardi (1,808) in 2020. Johnson suffered the only full losing season of his managerial career, finishing in third place eight games under .500 with 77 wins. While the Dodgers rebounded to second place the next year, it was not enough to save Johnson's job. He finished with a record of 163 wins and 161 losses despite having high-priced talent, such as Kevin Brown and Gary Sheffield (alongside growing talent in future Hall of Famer Adrian Beltre) by general manager Kevin Malone.

Olympics and Team USA
Johnson briefly managed the Netherlands national team in 2003 during the absence of Robert Eenhoorn, then served as a bench coach under Eenhoorn at the 2004 Summer Olympics. He had a ruptured appendix that had to have multiple stomach surgeries after it had gone undiagnosed. He then became manager of Team USA, where he managed the United States team to a seventh-place finish out of an 18-team field in the 2005 Baseball World Cup, held in The Netherlands. The team finished tied for second in its group during group play with a 6–2 record before falling, 11–3, to eventual winner and 24-time World Cup champion Cuba in the quarterfinals. A subsequent 9–0 loss to Nicaragua put the Americans into the seventh-place game with Puerto Rico, where they prevailed with an 11–3 win.

Johnson served as bench coach for Team USA during the 2006 World Baseball Classic, managed Team USA at the 2008 Summer Olympics, and managed Team USA in the 2009 World Baseball Classic. In 2009, Johnson was also the head coach for the Florida Collegiate Summer League, DeLand Suns, and returned as the head coach for the 2010 Sanford River Rats season.

Washington Nationals

Johnson first joined the Washington Nationals front office on June 7, 2006, when he was appointed as a consultant by vice president/general manager Jim Bowden. He was named a senior advisor to current GM Mike Rizzo after the 2009 campaign. He became the Nationals manager on June 26, 2011, after the unexpected resignation of Jim Riggleman three days earlier. He served as manager for the rest of the 2011 season. The Nationals won eighty total games in that season, which was good enough for a third-place finish, the best finish for the organization since the move to Washington. On October 31, the Nationals announced that Davey Johnson would be their manager for the 2012 season.

On October 1, 2012, Johnson led the Nationals to the franchise's first division title since 1981 (when they were the Montreal Expos), eventually achieving a franchise-record 98 wins—the most wins in baseball that year, headlined by rising stars in Stephen Strasburg, Gio Gonzalez, Ian Desmond, and Bryce Harper. However, the team would be without Strasburg for the postseason, as the organization had decreed he would only pitch 160 innings for the whole year (owing to recovering from UCL surgery that limited him in 2011), which he reached in his final start on September 7 (he finished with a 15–6 record and a 3.16 ERA). The Division Series marked the first playoff game in the District of Columbia in 79 years, and they faced the defending champion St. Louis Cardinals. While they won a close opening game, two subsequent blowouts put them on the wall for Game 4, which they won on a walk off home run by Jayson Werth. In Game 5, the Nationals jumped to a 6–0 lead by the third inning, but the lead slowly evaporated over the next five innings to where it was only 7-5 heading into the ninth inning. Drew Storen (who had pitched in the blowout loss in Game 2 and the two subsequent games) was sent to save the ninth inning, but the Cardinals rallied with one out remaining to score four runs to cap a dramatic meltdown for the Nationals. It was the third and final time that Johnson had led a team to the best record in the majors without leading them to the World Series. On November 10, Johnson signed a contract to return as manager of the Nationals for the 2013 season. Three days later, Johnson was named National League Manager of the Year. Johnson noted in his autobiography that just before being awarded the Manager of the Year award, he was offered to sign a document by owner Mark Lerner and GM Mike Rizzo to retire after the 2013 season, as opposed to simply not renewing the contract. At any rate, Johnson called the season a "World Series or bust" year, which came to backfire on him.

The 2013 team struggled after a promising start of winning seven of their first ten games, as they went into the All-Star break with a 48–47 record. Despite having a 18–9 record in the month of September, they finished four games out of a Wild Card berth while finishing second in the NL East with an 86–76 record. On September 29, 2013, Johnson announced his retirement. He had the club record for wins (224) until Dave Martinez passed him in 2021. In 2014, Johnson became a consultant.

Just fifteen managers have finished with a record of 300 or more wins above .500. Johnson finished with a record of 1,372–1,071–2 to finish 301 games above .500 as a manager. He is also tenth all time in winning percentage for managers with 1,000 wins. All but Johnson in each category have been inducted into the National Baseball Hall of Fame and Museum, and he has missed induction four times (twice on the Veterans Committee in 2008 and 2010 and twice with Today's Game ballot in 2017 and 2018)

Managerial record

Personal life
Johnson was born in Orlando, Florida.  He graduated from Alamo Heights High School in San Antonio, Texas. He also attended the Johns Hopkins University and Texas A&M University, and he graduated from Trinity University in 1964 with a bachelor's degree in mathematics. Johnson is known for taking a statistical approach to baseball that started with his playing career, where he earned the nickname "Dum Dum" for attempts at telling his pitching teammates to throw for the middle of the plate instead of the corner; he made computer printouts to present to manager Earl Weaver to supposedly optimize the lineup, although they weren't used. Upon being a manager, he pioneered computer-based sabermetrics while managing the Mets.

Johnson met his future wife, Susan, in 1993 (they married the following January) while she was organizing a golf tournament for her deaf-blind son Jake and his learning center (she also specialized in charity for Johns Hopkins Hospital).

Johnson's daughter, Andrea, was a nationally ranked amateur surfer in the late 1980s. Andrea died in 2005 from septic shock and complications from schizophrenia. In 2011, his stepson Jake died from pneumonia at the age of 34.

In 2018, he, alongside Erik Sherman, wrote his autobiography My Wild Ride in Baseball and Beyond, with the proceeds going to his wife Susan's nonprofit organization, Support Our Scholars.

In 2021, Johnson was treated in hospital after contracting COVID-19, but recovered.

See also

 List of Gold Glove middle infield duos
 List of Major League Baseball managers by wins

References
Notes

External links

Davey Johnson at SABR (Baseball BioProject)
Baseball Hall of Fame – 2008 Veterans Committee candidate profile
Davey Johnson at Baseball Biography

1943 births
Living people
American expatriate baseball players in Japan
American men's basketball players
American League All-Stars
Atlanta Braves players
Baltimore Orioles managers
Baltimore Orioles players
Baseball players from Orlando, Florida
Chicago Cubs players
Cincinnati Reds managers
Elmira Pioneers players
Gold Glove Award winners
Johns Hopkins University alumni
Los Angeles Dodgers managers
Major League Baseball second basemen
Manager of the Year Award winners
National League All-Stars
New York Mets managers
Norfolk Tides managers
Philadelphia Phillies players
Rochester Red Wings players
Sportspeople from Orlando, Florida
Sportspeople from Winter Park, Florida
Stockton Ports players
Texas A&M Aggies men's basketball players
Texas A&M Aggies baseball players
Trinity University (Texas) alumni
United States national baseball team managers
Washington Nationals managers
World Baseball Classic managers
World Series-winning managers
Yomiuri Giants players
Miami Amigos players